Falipamil is a calcium channel blocker.

Research 
Falipamil is a bradycardic agent focused on slowing the heart rate of living animals. The drug focuses on treating sinuses in living organisms, with the most common experiments being conducted in dogs. Falipamil is commonly administered to reduce sinus, and different dosage administrations have proven to bear different results When given in small doses, the drug is effective in reducing sinus rate, but when given in high dosages, the drug increases the sinus rate as the drug increases the atrial pumping rate increasing the body fluid pump through the body to the face. When Falipamil is administered, the drug decreases the ventricular rate of the heart, which in turn helps reduce the sinus rate in an organism.

Falipamil has different effects on the electrophysiological structure of the heart, where different dosages result in different heart activity rates with diverse vagolytic actions. Recent studies have been carried out on dogs to determine the effectiveness of the drug in treating sinuses. When administered to a conscious dog, the sinus heart rate of the dog increases, whereas when administered to a stale dog, the animal experiences a lessened heart rate. The electrophysiological result of administering Falipamil shows that the drug decreases the maximal atrial driving frequency when administered to a conscious dog, which is an effective measure in reducing sinus in a living organism. Falipamil administration also shows that the administration of the drug increases the body's action potential exerting less bradycardic effects that are effective in reducing sinuses. Fallipamil does have different recovery times when administered to dogs involved in different activities. Intact dogs are likely to have short sinus recovery time-conscious dogs. Falipamil has a positive effect on the heart's refractory period, where the drug prolongs the atrial refractory period.

References

Calcium channel blockers
Phenol ethers
Isoindolines
Lactams
Amines